Parzymiechy  is a village in the administrative district of Gmina Lipie, within Kłobuck County, Silesian Voivodeship, in southern Poland.

The village has a population of 715.

History
Parzymiechy was first mentioned in 1266.

In September 1939, during the German invasion of Poland, which started World War II, a battle was fought nearby. German troops burned the village on September 2, 1939 and murdered 75 Polish inhabitants, including 20 children (see Nazi crimes against the Polish nation).

Transport 
Main road connections from the Parzymiechy include connection with Praszka (to the west) and Działoszyn (to the north-east) via the National Road .

Gallery

References

External links 
Webpage about the village

Villages in Kłobuck County
Massacres of Poles
Nazi war crimes in Poland